Karim Bakhti (born 11 October 1969) is an Algerian footballer. He played in six matches for the Algeria national football team from 1994 to 1996. He was also named in Algeria's squad for the 1996 African Cup of Nations tournament.

References

External links
 
 

1969 births
Living people
Algerian footballers
Algeria international footballers
1996 African Cup of Nations players
Association football midfielders
21st-century Algerian people
CR Belouizdad players
Algerian football managers
CR Belouizdad managers